Hutberg may refer to:

 Hutberg (Dürrhennersdorf), a mountain of Saxony, Germany
 Hutberg (Oderwitz), a mountain of Saxony, Germany